Winnie Waldron  is an American music producer for video games, a producer for radio, a radio script editor / adapter, a manuscript editor and a radio host.

Career

Radio 
Waldron began her professional relationship with National Public Radio via the radio drama series Tales from the Other Side, a science fiction speculative series which aired as a part of NPR Playhouse in 1992.  For this series, Waldron served as script editor, actress, on-air host and co-producer with her long-time creative partner Winifred Phillips.

From 1992 to 2003, Waldron served as on-air host, producer and script editor / adapter for a series of radio dramas, first presented on National Public Radio Playhouse under the title Generations Radio Theater Presents, and then later as Generations Radio Theater Presents: Radio Tales.  This anthology series adapted classic works of American and world literature, and was a recipient of funding from the National Endowment for the Arts.  The programs air regularly as the Radio Tales series on the Sirius XM Book Radio channel of Sirius XM Satellite Radio.

Video games
Waldron's latest project is the Jurassic World Primal Ops video game, developed and published in 2022 by Behaviour Interactive in association with Universal Pictures and Amblin Entertainment.

Her most recent previous projects include the Lineage M: The Elmor video game DLC released in 2021 from publisher/developer NCSoft, and the Sackboy: A Big Adventure video game, developed by Sumo Digital and published in 2020 by Sony Interactive Entertainment.

Waldron also produced music for the Sumo Digital developed game Spyder, released in 2020 for the Apple Arcade platform.

Waldron produced music in 2016 for the Homefront: The Revolution videogame, developed by DS Dambuster and published by Deep Silver.

In 2015, Waldron produced music for the Total War Battles: KINGDOM video game, developed by Creative Assembly and published by Sega.

Waldron served as music producer for the video game LittleBigPlanet 3: her work on this project earned a Hollywood Music in Media Award in the category of "Best Song in a Video Game."

To date, Waldron has produced music for seven games in the LittleBigPlanet franchise, including LittleBigPlanet 2,  LittleBigPlanet 2: Cross Controller,  LittleBigPlanet 2: Toy Story (DLC), LittleBigPlanet Karting, LittleBigPlanet PS Vita and LittleBigPlanet 3.

LittleBigPlanet 2 was nominated for the 15th Annual Interactive Achievement Awards in the category of 'Outstanding Achievement in Original Music Composition'. LittleBigPlanet 2 was also nominated for the 2011 Game Developers Choice Awards in the category of 'Best Audio', which recognizes the overall excellence of audio in a game - including musical composition, orchestration, sound design, sound effects, etc. The 10th Annual Game Audio Network Guild Awards nominated the original music track, Victoria's Lab from LittleBigPlanet 2 in the category of 'Best Original Vocal - Pop'. Kotaku named the score of LittleBigPlanet 2 as one of the best video game soundtracks of the year.  In the article "The Best Game Music of 2011: LittleBigPlanet 2", Features Editor Kirk Hamilton praised both the collection of licensed tracks and the original score, singling out theVictoria's Lab and Eve's Asylum tracks as his favorite original music of the game.

Waldron produced the music for the video game Assassin's Creed III: Liberation, which was also released as a soundtrack album on October 30, 2012. She won a 2012 Hollywood Music in Media Award and a GameFocus Award for producing the music score for Assassin's Creed III: Liberation. The main theme music of the Assassin's Creed III: Liberation video game won a G.A.N.G. Award from the Game Audio Network Guild in the category of "Best Original Vocal Song - Choral."'  As the music producer for this game, Waldron also received nominations in several year-end award competitions, including the GameZone Awards, the Best of IGN Awards, and the G4TV X-Play Best of 2012 Awards.

Waldron's first project as a music producer for video games was the God of War adventure game from Sony Computer Entertainment America.

In 2007, Waldron worked with creative partner Winifred Phillips to produce a cover version of the theme song from the Super Mario Bros. video game for the compilation CD entitled Best of the Best: A Tribute to Game Music, Volume I, released by GameMusicCentral.

In 2008, she was music producer for the Speed Racer video game.

In 2009, Waldron produced the music of the Spore Hero videogame from Electronic Arts.

Also in 2009, Waldron served as music producer for the video game "SimAnimals" for the Wii.  The music of "SimAnimals" was released as a downloadable soundtrack album by the record company E.A.R.S. EA Recordings on January 13, 2009.

Waldron is credited as music producer for the 2009 XBLA game The Maw.

Other video games for which Waldron served as music producer include Legend of the Guardians: The Owls of Ga'Hoole, Shrek the Third, The Da Vinci Code, and Charlie and the Chocolate Factory.

Waldron produced the music for the Legend of the Guardians: The Owls of Ga'Hoole video game soundtrack album, which was released on October 26, 2010 by WaterTower Music, a division of Warner Bros.  One of the tracks on the album, entitled "With Hearts Sublime", is a winner of a 2010 Hollywood Music in Media Award in the category "Best Original Song - Video Game".

Other
Waldron served as the first manuscript editor of the book, A Composer's Guide to Game Music, which was published by MIT Press in March 2014.

Awards
 Global Music Awards 2021: Best Video Game Soundtrack - "Waltz of the Bubbles" from Sackboy: A Big Adventure
 Global Music Awards 2021: Best Video Game Soundtrack - Spyder
 Global Music Awards 2015: Best Game Music - Total War Battles: Kingdom
 Hollywood Music in Media Award 2014: LittleBigPlanet 3
 Global Music Award 2013: Assassin's Creed III: Liberation
 Hollywood Music in Media Award 2012: Assassin's Creed III: Liberation
 Game Audio Network Guild Award 2012: Best Original Vocal Song - Choral (Assassin's Creed III: Liberation)
 Game Audio Network Guild Award 2012: Best Use of Licensed Music - LittleBigPlanet Karting
 GameFocus Award: Best Music - Assassin's Creed III: Liberation
 Hollywood Music in Media Award 2010: Best Original Song: Video Game - "With Hearts Sublime" (Legend of the Guardians: The Owls of Ga'Hoole)
 Movie Music U.K. Music Awards 2009: Best Score: Game - Spore Hero (Honorable Mention)
 Academy of Interactive Arts and Sciences Interactive Achievement Award: Outstanding Achievement in Original Music Composition (God of War)
 Game Audio Network Guild Award 2005: Music of the Year (God of War)
 Game Audio Network Guild Award 2005: Best Interactive Score (God of War)
 Game Audio Network Guild Award 2005: Best Cinematic / Cut-Scene Audio (God of War)
 Game Audio Network Guild Award 2005: Audio of the Year (God of War)
 GameSpot's Best of 2005: Best Original Music (God of War)
 PAX Gamers: Game of the Year Awards 2005: Best Sound (God of War)
 IGN PS2 Best Original Score (God of War)
 GameZone 2005 Game of the Year Awards: Best Original Score (God of War)
 American Women in Radio and Television Gracie Award 2004: Best National Network Drama (Radio Tales)
 American Women in Radio and Television Gracie Award 2003: Best National Network Drama (Radio Tales)
 American Women in Radio and Television Gracie Award 2001: Best National Network Drama (Radio Tales))
 The New York Festivals WorldMedal 2004: (Radio Tales)
 Golden Reel Merit Award 2001 (Radio Tales)

Nominations
 BAFTA Awards 2021: Best Original Music - Sackboy: A Big Adventure (Nomination)
 NAVGTR Awards 2021: Outstanding Song Collection - Sackboy: A Big Adventure (Nomination)
 NAVGTR Awards 2021: Outstanding Original Light Mix Score, New IP - Spyder (Nomination)
 G4TV X-Play's Best of 2012 Award: Best Soundtrack - Assassin's Creed III: Liberation (Nomination)
 GameZone Awards: Best Original Soundtrack - Assassin's Creed III: Liberation (Nomination)
 Best of IGN Awards: Best PS Vita Sound - Assassin's Creed III: Liberation (Nomination)
 10th Annual Game Audio Network Guild Awards: Best Original Vocal - Pop: "Victoria's Lab" from LittleBigPlanet 2 (Nomination)
 15th Annual Interactive Achievement Award: Outstanding Achievement in Original Music Composition - LittleBigPlanet 2 (Nomination)
 Game Developers Choice Award 2011: Best Audio - LittleBigPlanet 2 (Nomination)
 International Film Music Critics Association Awards 2009: Best Original Score for a Video Game or Interactive Media - Spore Hero (Nomination)
 Hollywood Music in Media Awards 2009: Original Score: Video Game - Spore Hero (Nomination)
 Hollywood Music Awards 2008: Original Score: Video Game - Speed Racer: The Videogame (Nomination)
 The Audio Publishers Association Audie Award (Nomination)
 G4 TV G-Phoria Award Best Original Soundtrack (Nomination)
 Spike TV Video Game Awards Best Original Score (Nomination)

Works

Video game soundtracks
 Lineage M
 Sackboy: A Big Adventure
 Spyder
 The Dark Eye: Book of Heroes
 Sports Scramble
 Ballista
 Shattered State
 Audioshield
 Scraper: First Strike
 Dragon Front
 Fail Factory
 Assassin's Creed III: Liberation
 Charlie and the Chocolate Factory (video game)
 The Da Vinci Code (video game)
 God of War (video game)
 Homefront: The Revolution
 Legend of the Guardians: The Owls of Ga'Hoole (video game)
 LittleBigPlanet 2 (Victoria's Lab & Eve's Asylum Levels)
 LittleBigPlanet 2: Cross Controller
 LittleBigPlanet 2: Toy Story (DLC)
 LittleBigPlanet 3
 LittleBigPlanet Karting
 LittleBigPlanet PS Vita
 The Maw (video game)
 Shrek the Third (video game)
 SimAnimals (video game)
 Speed Racer (video game)
 Spore Hero (video game)
 Total War Battles: KINGDOM

References

External links
 
 Winnie Waldron's listing in the MobyGames Database

Year of birth missing (living people)
Living people
American radio actresses
American radio personalities
Place of birth missing (living people)
Video game producers
American radio producers
Women in the video game industry
21st-century American women
Women radio producers